Roy Lee Porter (July 30, 1923 – January 24, 1998) was an American jazz drummer.

Early life
Born in Walsenburg, Colorado, Porter moved to Colorado Springs when he was eight and began playing drums in rhythm and blues bands while a teenager. He attended Wiley College in Texas briefly, where trumpeter Kenny Dorham was a fellow student. He joined Milt Larkin's band in 1943, replacing Joe Marshall.

Career 
After military service, Porter settled in Los Angeles, and his services were soon in demand by some of the pioneers of bebop. He worked with Teddy Bunn and Howard McGhee, making his first recordings with the latter. In 1946, he backed Charlie Parker on such Dial classics as "A Night In Tunisia", "Yardbird Suite", "Ornithology" and the unfortunate recording of "Lover Man".

Porter played on Los Angeles' Central Avenue with such bebop players as Dexter Gordon, Wardell Gray and Teddy Edwards, and in San Francisco with Hampton Hawes and Sonny Criss. He organized and went on the road with a big band in 1949 that included Art Farmer, Jimmy Knepper and Eric Dolphy.

During the 1950s, Porter was inactive as a jazz musician due to drug problems and returned to music only infrequently afterwards.

References

1923 births
1998 deaths
American jazz drummers
West Coast jazz drummers
Bebop drummers
Musicians from Colorado Springs, Colorado
20th-century American drummers
American male drummers
People from Walsenburg, Colorado
Jazz musicians from Colorado
20th-century American male musicians
American male jazz musicians